Rahim Zafer (born 21 January 1971 in Adapazarı) is a former Turkish football player.

Zafer played for several clubs during his career including Sakaryaspor (1987–1990 and 2002–2003), Gençlerbirliği SK (1990–1996), Beşiktaş JK (1996–2001), Diyarbakırspor (2001–2002), Adanaspor (2004–2005), MKE Kırıkkalespor (2005–2006) and Daegu FC (2003–2004). He played for the Turkey national football team and was a player-participant at the 1996 UEFA European Championship. Since retiring in 2006, Zafer has been assistant manager for Kastamonuspor, Uşakspor and ABB Bugsaş SK.

International goals
Results list Turkey's goal tally first.

External links
 Profile at TFF.org
 

1971 births
Living people
Sportspeople from Adapazarı
Association football defenders
Turkish footballers
Turkish expatriate footballers
Turkey international footballers
Sakaryaspor footballers
Gençlerbirliği S.K. footballers
Beşiktaş J.K. footballers
Diyarbakırspor footballers
Daegu FC players
Adanaspor footballers
Süper Lig players
K League 1 players
Expatriate footballers in South Korea
UEFA Euro 1996 players
Turkish expatriate sportspeople in South Korea
Turkey under-21 international footballers
Turkey youth international footballers
MKE Kırıkkalespor footballers
Mediterranean Games gold medalists for Turkey
Mediterranean Games medalists in football
Competitors at the 1993 Mediterranean Games